The Yelü clan (Khitan: , spelled , pronounced Yeruuld), alternatively rendered as Yila  or Yarud, was a prominent family of ethnic Khitan origin in the history of China. The clan assumed leadership of the Khitan tribal confederation in 907 when Abaoji was made khagan. In 916, Abaoji founded the Liao dynasty. After the fall of the Liao dynasty in 1125, members of the Yelü family continued to play significant roles in history, most notably for ruling the Western Liao and during the Mongols era of conquest in the 13th century. Yelü Chucai, the last recorded person to be able to speak and read the Khitan language, is notable for advising Genghis Khan in the Confucian tradition.

The Yelü clan established numerous dynastic regimes in Chinese history: the Liao dynasty, Northern Liao, Western Liao, Eastern Liao, and Later Liao. In particular, the Liao dynasty and Western Liao were powerful empires that had significant impact on regional history.

Rise to power

Abaoji, born in 872, was the son of the chieftain of the Yila tribe. At this time, the Yaolian clan had led the Khitan people since the mid-eighth century, and were the only Khitan family to have adopted a surname at this point as this was seen as a mark of Han culture and not befitting of peoples of the steppe.

In 901, Abaoji was elected chieftain of the Yila tribe and in 905 forged relations with Li Keyong of the Shatuo Turks. In 907, he was chosen leader of the Khitans, the first outside the Yaolian lineage to be chosen in more than a century and a half. From this, Abaoji and his successors developed the Liao dynasty, which would conquer all of Manchuria, the northern fringe of the Central Plain known as the Sixteen Prefectures and adjacent areas of northern Korea, eastern Mongolian Plateau and parts of far-eastern Siberia.

Liao dynasty

Every monarch of the Liao dynasty was from the Yelü clan, which adopted the surname sometime in the 930s, after the death of Abaoji (Emperor Taizu). The clan directly governed the southern half of the empire while the Xiao consort clan governed the north. The Southern Chancellory was charged with governing the sedentary population of the empire, mostly ethnic Han and residents of the conquered kingdom of Bohai. As such, there is evidence of at least limited Sinicization on the part of the Yelü clan.

Even as late as 1074, a proposal was brought before the Liao emperors to adopt surnames throughout the empire. This was rejected as an idea that would disrupt the traditional Khitan social order.

The Liao dynasty fell to the Jurchen-led Jin dynasty in 1125, but a branch of the Yelü imperial clan survived and established another dynastic empire in the Western Regions known as the Western Liao, also called the Qara Khitai.

Yelü leaders

Liao dynasty

Western Liao dynasty

See also
Khitan people
Liao dynasty
Northern Liao
Western Liao
Eastern Liao
Later Liao

References

|-

|-

|-

Khitan history
Liao dynasty

Chinese clans
Individual Chinese surnames